The 2014 Gold Coast Sevens was the first tournament of the 2014-15 Sevens World Series. It was held over the weekend of 11–12 October 2014 at Cbus Super Stadium in Queensland, Australia, and was the twelfth completed edition of the Australian Sevens tournament.

Format
The teams were drawn into four pools of four teams each. Each team played everyone in their pool one time. The top two teams from each pool advanced to the Cup/Plate brackets. The bottom two teams from each group went to the Bowl/Shield brackets.

Teams
Participating teams and schedule were announced on 16 September 2014.

Match officials
The match officials for the 2014 Gold Coast Sevens are as follows:

  Mike Adamson (Scotland)
  Federico Anselmi (Argentina)
  Nick Briant (New Zealand)
  Richard Kelly (New Zealand)
  Anthony Moyes (Australia)
  Matt O'Brien (Australia)
  Rasta Rasivhenge (South Africa)
  Marius van der Westhuizen (South Africa)

Pool Stage

Pool A

Pool B

Pool C

Pool D

Knockout stage

Shield

Bowl

Plate

Cup

Scoring

References

External links
Gold Coast Sevens

Australian Sevens
Gold Coast Sevens
Gold Coast Sevens
Sport on the Gold Coast, Queensland